Illegal, unreported and unregulated fishing (IUU) in the Arctic (see discussion of the Arctic boundaries) is an under researched scientific field. The most recent academic articles about IUU in the Arctic mainly concerns the mid-2000s.

The research of IUU fishing in the Arctic and elsewhere in the world is complex and a multidisciplinary effort. Scholars researching IUU in the Arctic include political scientists, jurists, biologists, data scientists, risk analysts.
The complexity of the issue, the remoteness of the region and the vast expenditures needed to conduct research in the Arctic are likely causes for this lack of knowledge.

Extent

The shady nature of IUU fishing makes it difficult for scholars and governments alike to get an overall view of the total amount of the IUU fishing in the Arctic. Scholars dealing with IUU in the Arctic often investigates a few subsets of species such as cod and haddock or the king crab. Thus, an overall view of IUU fishing of all commercially caught species in the Arctic is not available.

Arctic CodThe International Council for the Exploration of the Sea (ICES) has estimated the amount of the unreported arctic cod for in the Food and Agriculture Organization's (FAO) subarea 1 and 2 (The Barents Sea and parts of the Norwegian Sea). ICES estimate that in 1990–1994 and 2002–2008 between 3.2% and 25.2% of the total catch of arctic cod was unreported. Although there is no knowledge about IUU fishing outside those periods ICES believes that by 2018 IUU fishing of arctic cod is close to zero.

HaddockBetween 2002 and 2008 ICES estimates that between 3.7% and 25.4% of the landing of haddocks from the Russian and Norwegian parts of the Barents Sea was unreported. In 2018 they estimated that the IUU catches of haddock is close to zero.

King CrabA major decrease in the Russian king crab stock of the Barents Sea was observed between 2007 and 2008. Researchers mainly attribute the decline of king crabs to IUU fishing. The decrease of king crabs eventually led to a moratorium of fishing of the king crabs in the waters off the coast of the Kola Peninsula. This has resulted in an increased abundance of king crabs.

Regulation of Arctic fisheries
The management of Arctic fisheries is regulated by at least three layers of legislation. The global United Nations Convention on the Law of the Sea (UNCLOS), agreements related to Regional Fisheries Management Organisations (RFMO's) or bilateral agreements and national legislation.

United Nations' Law of the Seas (UNCLOS)
The UNCLOS serve as the underlying legal framework for the governance of the world's oceans. Article 56 gives States sovereign rights for the exploitation and management of living resources within states' exclusive economic zone (EEZ). However States should ensure:Furthermore, States should cooperate in global, regional or subregional organizations to further this goal. States have the same obligations for the conservation of living resources on the high seas.
Several scholars do not consider the UNCLOS as adequate to secure fisheries in the Arctic high seas from IUU. Instead scholars recommend the establishment of an effective RFMO's to regulate the high's seas of the Arctic.

Regional Fishery Management Organizations and Bilateral Agreements

A patchwork of RFMO's and bilateral fishery agreements regulate fisheries in the Arctic. RFMO's have different regulatory competences such as geographical scope, type of species. Thus, no RFMO or bilateral fishery agreement claim competence of the whole of the Arctic or all commercially fished species in the Arctic. 
For some RFMO's the Arctic is only a minor part of the RFMO's area of competence. For example, the International Commission for the Conservation of Atlantic Tunas (ICCAT) covers the whole Atlantic Ocean including adjacent seas and regulate the capture of tuna species. Other agreements cover only small parts of the Arctic. This apply for example for the bilateral Joint Norwegian-Russian Fisheries Commission which regulates fisheries in the Barents Sea and parts of the Norwegian Sea and the Agreement to Prevent Unregulated High Seas Fisheries in the Central Arctic Ocean regulates the Central Arctic Ocean. The Agreement to Prevent Unregulated High Seas Fisheries in the Central Arctic Ocean came into force in June 2021.

To diminish IUU fishing in the Arctic some RFMO's have established Port State Control measures and blacklisted vessels known for not observing national and international law.

National legislation and enforcement
As stated by the UNCLOS art. 56 States have sovereign rights of the management of fishery resources in States’ EEZ's. This has resulted in the fact that States have assigned different services to prevent IUU fishing in the Arctic.

Denmark
In Greenlandic waters the Royal Danish Navy is responsible for the enforcement of fishery law and fishery agreements beyond 3 nautical miles off the baseline (sea). Within 3 nautical miles off the baseline Greenland's Fishery License Control (Greenlandic: Kalaallit Nunaanni Aalisarsinnaanermut Akuersissutinik Nakkutilliisoqarfiup) monitor fisheries.

United States
In US Arctic it is the United States Coast Guard is the responsible service for fishery law enforcement and thereby the preventing IUU fishing in the US Arctic waters.

Norway
The Norwegian Coast Guard is responsible for enforcing the rules regarding IUU fishing together with the Directorate of Fisheries. According to the Norwegian Government, the Coast Guard's monitoring of fisheries in the Norwegian EEZ and the protection zones around Jan Mayen and the Svalbard archipelago are one of the highest priorities of the Coast Guard.

Canada
The Canadian Armed Forces (CAF) as well as the Department of Fisheries and Ocean (DFO) are responsible for the enforcement of fishery treaties and laws regarding fishery.  The CAF provide surveillance flights for DFO and its ships carry DFO officers, so they can inspect and fishing vessels in Canadian and international waters.

Russia
In Russia the Federal Agency for Fishery (Rosrybolovstvo) enforces fishery legislation in Russian waters as well as in international waters where Russia has signed RFMO agreements.

References 

Illegal, unreported and unregulated fishing
Arctic